Ivo Sasek (born 10 July 1956 in Zürich) is a Swiss-German lay preacher, author of religious writings and leader of the religious sect Organic Christ Generation (OCG), which he founded in 1999. This organization, classified as a cult, has between two and three thousand members. In 2008, Sasek founded the "Anti-Censorship Coalition" (AZK), a forum for right-wing esotericism, conspiracy theories, antisemitism, xenophobia and historical revisionism, including Holocaust denial. From Sasek's Panorama Center in Walzenhausen, Switzerland, these organizations and their numerous media outlets are run, including the neo-Right online channel Klagemauer.tv. Sasek rejects an open, democratic and pluralistic society.

Personal background 
Ivo Sasek is a trained car mechanic. According to his own account, he experienced a visionary conversion to Christianity in 1977. In 1978, he left his job, joined the Newlife movement and worked, among other things, as a preacher at Gospelradio Zürich. He attended a Bible school, but without graduating. The school reportedly rejected his visionary experiences as Pentecostal spiritual gifts. Beginning in 1980, Sasek became known for his work with drug addicts and gained his first followers. In 1984 he founded the drug rehabilitation center Obadja in Walzenhausen. A "School of Life" and a "Discipleship School" followed. He began a church teaching ministry, touring churches in German-speaking countries and spreading his messages with writings and audio tapes. Around 1999, he introduced an assessment ministry to test a person's spiritual condition, which gave rise to the Organic Christ Generation (OCG).

Sasek has been married since 1983. The couple Anni and Ivo Sasek have (as of 2004) eleven children, who as of 2010 together with their parents are involved in spreading he thoughts of the OCG. They are regularly on tour during the summer months with self-written musicals, children's songs, films, and life testimonies. A network of house groups of OCG followers organized their performances, where they portrayed themselves as followers of their father's teachings, ideal Christian families, and role models for the OCG's "organic" family and church life. At times, Sasek also undertook “mission trips” through France, Belgium, Di Ukraine and Romania. Three sons and a daughter-in-law have escaped their sect.

"Organic Christ Generation"

End-time claim to absoluteness 
Sasek allows himself to be called "the perfecter of the Reformation" and a "true theologian" who speaks "through God his actual word into this time." He claims in his publications that he has "seen God" and that God "Himself delivered" him at birth. He sees himself as an apostle to the nations and judgement prophet who can measure the faith of other Christians, recognize and distinguish truth from falsehood. The yardstick for this is his claimed personal visionary experiences of life and God. In doing so, he equates himself and his message with God: "I say: whoever speaks against this message; I say: whoever speaks against me and this message, whoever does not submit to the word that I say, I Ivo Sasek here in Walzenhausen, is not a true servant of God." "If someone speaks against me, then he speaks against God, I say it the same as it is."

Sasek understands the Bible as an unfinished Word of God, which is supplemented by current spiritual revelations in each case. He believes in the imminent end of the world, relates texts of biblical apocalyptic directly to zeitgeschichtliche events and links them to current conspiracy theories. Since 2008, Sasek has also integrated the idea of reincarnation into his system. Since it has little biblical evidence, he claims that the Second Council of Constantinople (533) purposefully removed this concept from the Bible.

Sasek conveys his message in the manner of early Christian epistles to OCG groups, but also to local church congregations. In them, for example, he preaches against "self-sufficient prosperity Christianity" and "security of salvation," calls other church leaders false prophets, invites them to his events and threatens them with God's judgment if they refuse. For Sasek, Christians can only survive God's impending Last Judgment if they integrate themselves with absolute obedience into an overall divine order in marriage, family and education. He described this order in March 2017 as an "organism" in which all are "existentially intertwined" like a human body and "fatefully united" with one another "according to organic laws and principles." This organic community is superior to every individuality and is presently "newly generated (brought forth) from Christ." In order to fit into it, he says, each individual must make a radical renunciation of sin, give up his self-will, and separate himself from sinners. He does not, however, demand that people leave conventional congregations, but rather that they confess the OCG within them and form small interdenominational house cells.

"Assessment" 
With regular "assessment services," Sasek and "sinless" helpers trained by him claim to determine the degree of incorporation into the OCG. In three-day courses, participants are asked to work through questions set by Sasek in order to encourage them to engage in self-reflection, self-transformation, and community-building. Sasek describes this "assessment" as "self-help" that has grown out of "decades of therapy and family support" and has already helped "thousands of people and hundreds of families to live harmoniously together."

Participants have reported, however, that Sasek says they are complete unsuitabie for the organism of Christ, and has been confronting them since 2008 with alleged sins from previous lives, and does not allow them to have their own idea of being a Christian: only those who follow his radical rules of obedience, submission and self-sacrifice pass the "assessment" and are counted among the "new, redeemed and sinless" generation. This compulsion to submit causes severe identity crises and psychological breakdowns.

Raising children 
For Sasek, children are the "birth out of a whole generation of redeemers." If they "grow up in unclouded eye contact and undivided relationship with God Almighty," they would "become, without distraction, an ever-swelling force field of God" through which "works of God are done such as the world has never seen." Birth control and abortions are an enemy-directed murder wave to stop this savior generation, he said. To prepare children for their divinely predestined task, parents and educators would have to combat all fleshly passions opposed to the Spirit of God from the beginning. In order for children to learn complete submission to what Sasek claims is God's will, he recommends physical violence as a supposedly necessary, biblically based means of education. Parents could not presuppose good will on the part of children, but had to break their self-will. If they drove out evil from them only thoroughly enough, the good would flow like a law of nature of its own accord, independent of the Christian faith. Ingratitude, dissatisfaction or listlessness on the part of the children should be punished by the parents with renunciation or arrest, in order to teach the child humility. If they resisted, they were to be beaten on the buttocks with a bamboo rod to the point of "bloody welts." Just as Sasek cites the example of his mother, who he says rightly beat him as a child, three of his minor children published the book Mama, Please Chastise Me! in 2000 with Sasek's Elaion publishing house. In it, Sasek's eldest son Simon described punishment with a bamboo rod and the childish fear of it. Sasek's parenting advice on corporal punishment twice led to criminal charges of child abuse; the investigations were dropped on each occasion.

Sasek's teachings give rise to a strong distrust of state institutions and a front against authorities. The OCG rejects, for example, legal vaccinations, sex education, and scientific educational concepts, which often brings its adherents into conflict with schools, youth welfare offices, and family courts. OCG groups network and propagandize through digital media, courses, and training camps. Despite its relatively small membership of around 2000, the OCG is therefore said to reach tens of thousands of people at times.

A 21-year-old dropout reported in August 2018 that she had been punished and beaten repeatedly for the smallest of mistakes until her teenage years. Outside contacts had been minimized, they had tried to break her will. Brainwashing, mutual control, indoctrination and intimidation would determine life within the group. She had succeeded in getting out through a stay in hospital, where she had experienced personal attention for the first time. Sasek disputed the account and affirmed that the OCG existed "in a heart-connectedness, in a deep awareness of the togetherness of all the people of this world."

By November 2018, more people had left the OCG, including Sasek's eldest son Simon. Almost all of them told ORF of serious experiences of violence, but did not want to go on camera for fear of repression, or only anonymously. However, Simon has been running a YouTube channel since 2018, on which he talks openly about his exit. Sasek attributed his son's exit to "persecution by the mass media" and declined to be interviewed.

Data Collection 
According to research by Bayerischer Rundfunk, in January 2020 the OCG asked its supporters to collect data on politicians and journalists and find out "who is friend or foe".  Until the end of April 2020, the OCG collected and stored private data from around 8,200 people from German-speaking countries, mostly publicly accessible data such as home addresses, cell phone numbers, religious affiliation, nationality and sexual orientation. Representatives of all German parties, state parliaments and the Bundestag are affected, as well as civil servants, journalists and activists, including critics of the sect and several chairmen of Jewish institutions. For some, their "Jewish origin" is noted. Sensitive information was also collected from some government politicians. When asked about this, Sasek explained that the data collection serves to "educate" OCG members about "the nature and attitude of our representatives" and is only for "internal use".  He did not explain the remarks about Jews.

The extremism researcher Andreas Zick spoke of a "racist list" with a scope that is otherwise only known from Enemy Lists of right-wing extremists or Jihadists because of the categories recorded. Because of the murder of people who were previously on such lists, there is a high risk for those affected this time too. The Landtag Bayern commissioned the state government to investigate the activities of the sect in more detail. The General Public Prosecutor's Office in Munich is conducting preliminary investigations on suspicion of incitement to hatred against the OCG.

"Anti-Censorship-Coalition"

Goals 
In 2008, Sasek founded the Anti-Censorship Coalition (AZK). It calls itself "Europe's largest platform for uncensored information" so that people could hear "voices and dissenting voices," including "highly qualified expert voices from around the world." Sasek organizes and directs annual "anti-censorship conferences" and has representatives of all sorts of conspiracy theories appear there. His goal is considered to be to unsettle listeners until they turn away from democracy: "I say, without dictatorship it doesn't work, because: This creation is not set up for democracy. It does not function according to democratic principles." According to Heinzpeter Hempelmann (EKD), AZK does not represent a common substantive concern, but forms a reference group for people who feel oppressed by the alleged mainstream and try to sell their interpretation of freedom of speech. AZK specifically writes to politicians to win them over to the ideas. At the same time, according to Österreichischer Rundfunk (ORF), Sasek and AZK obstructed ORF media research, insult and threaten critical journalists.

Speakers and topics 
At the first AZK in spring 2008, Werner Altnickel claimed chemtrails were sprayed to poison thinking (mind control) and trigger droughts, famines and wars. At the second AZK on 27. September 2008, Sasek had the Germanic New Medicine of Ryke Geerd Hamer presented in detail.

At the 2009 AZK, historical revisionist Gerd Schultze-Rhonhof and Jürg Stettler, press spokesman for the German Church of Scientology and president of its Swiss branch, spoke. Stettler attacked mainly the media. At the 2010 AZK, the convicted Swiss Holocaust denier Bernhard Schaub held far-right views. Sasek congratulated him on his speech. At the 2011 AZK, far-right filmmaker Michael Vogt ("Secret File Heß") that National Socialist Rudolf Hess undertook his 1941 flight to England on Adolf Hitler's initiative to hold peace talks. At the 2012 AZK in the Chur town hall, Sasek invited Sylvia Stolz, a convicted far-right Holocaust denier, to be the keynote speaker. In welcoming her, he declared that against the "manipulation of opinion" by the media, AZK wanted to "awaken" the people and make them the light bearers and fighting force of truth. He asked the audience to repeat the motto "I am strong through truth" in the chant.

In her lecture, Stolz claimed, contrary to the facts, that the Holocaust had never been proven in court, that all "testimonies, documents or other evidence" were missing for "the crime scenes, methods of killing, number of dead, periods of the crime, perpetrators, corpses or traces of murder" and for the National Socialist "intention to destroy Jewry in whole or in part". The German people no longer let themselves be oppressed. She challenged the audience to get to know Nazis and received enthusiastic applause. Sasek thanked her emotionally, calling her a woman with the "courage of a lion," who had helped "seek and find the truth." He published her lecture on the Internet.

The Bernese lawyer Daniel Kettiger then denounced Stolz and Sasek for violations of the racism criminal code: Sasek had invited Stolz in the knowledge of her crimes and had not withdrawn the floor from her "as a responsible moderator" when she engaged in obvious Holocaust denial over a longer period of time. Sasek stressed that he did not necessarily adopt the content of guest speeches at AZK meetings as his own. All guest lectures would be legally reviewed beforehand. In Stolz's case, he said, nothing had been found "that had anything to do with Holocaust denial or anti-Semitism." That is why her lecture was judged to be unobjectionable and published. He received a Straffenzbefehl (penalty court notice) in 2017 for providing a stage for Holocaust deniers. After appealing against it, he was acquitted by final judgment in 2018. Sylvia Stolz, on the other hand, was sentenced in 2018 to 18 months in prison without probation for Volksverhetzung after an appeal trial.

AZK 2013 took place on November 23, again at the Stadthalle Chur. Its administration, Expo-Chur AG, had refrained from banning him because Sasek had not been criminally convicted until then.

Until then, the AZKs were mainly advertised and announced in right-wing to right-wing extremist circles advertised and announced. Sasek kept the location of the 2014 AZK secret and only issued tickets for it through personal mediation. He gave an introductory lecture on "How to prevent a world war?" In the unabridged version, which was available to the Tages-Anzeiger, he claimed: the political and economic establishment as well as "warmongering media" were preparing a third World War with targeted misleadings. These media would therefore have to be silenced. Christians, who did not believe in the secret conspiratorial powers, were "pants-shitting and good-for-nothing" and "real assholes". Because of them, the devil is currently "letting the sow out". With his tool America (the USA) and conspiratorial forces he starts an annihilation of 6.5 billion people to reduce mankind "to a minimum". Bankers, politicians and media people are satanic bandits and criminals. The people are media dumbed down and are led to the slaughter by the warmongers like animals without reason. The Protocols of the Wise Men of Zion would have described the chaos orchestrated by the devil. Thus Sasek adopted the anti-Semitic conspiracy theory of an alleged world Jewry. Also in a sermon, which is available to Deutschlandfunk, Sasek expressed about the Protocols that one does not need to argue about it, "did the Jews write it or do the Jews implement it?". We must conclude: it was written and it is being implemented." Furthermore, he recommended reading Hitler's book Mein Kampf and called for distrusting all media. As a goal, he formulated, I am preparing to change the people, to manipulate them, if you will, for my way.

Swiss historian Daniele Ganser then spoke on "Covert warfare: a look behind the scenes of power politics." He emphasized that he had not known Sasek until then and had only learned via Google that Sasek, like himself, was against warmongering. Furthermore, Jürgen Elsässer, Mathias Ebert appeared for the initiative "Besorgte Eltern" and U.S. communications scholar Judith A. Reisman appeared as speakers. Ebert and Reisman claimed that current sexology, sex education, and the sexual revolution are a pedophilia conspiracy introduced by sex researcher Alfred Charles Kinsey. Conspiracy directing Western curricula to impose "early sexualization" of children. Ebert advocated a boycott of school sex education, with parents facing imprisonment if necessary. The heterosexual nuclear family, he argued, was the only proper place for children's sex education.

A regular AZK speaker is Andreas Popp ("Wissensmanufaktur"), a critic of interest oriented towards the National Socialist Gottfried Feder.
Other AZK speakers included representatives of the SVP such as Olivier Kessler, initiator of the "No-Billag" initiative (March 2015), Luzi Stamm (November 2015) and Ulrich Schlüer (October 2016). Cult expert Hugo Stamm criticized such politicians' appearances as irresponsible legitimization for and trivialization of Sasek's cult and conspiracy theories.

The AZK 2016, declared as a "friends' meeting", took place again in the Stadthalle Chur. Place and speaker kept Sasek again secret. Up to 2500 visitors were expected. At AZK 2017, he claimed that many new books by "high-level historians" show "a completely different picture, for example, of Adolf Hitler." He asked his listeners, "Yes, and now, if that was one who comes right after Jesus Christ, what are you doing? If this is one who is of the rank of an apostle?" In response to queries from "Rundschau", Sasek replied that the speech quote was only an extreme example in the context of his speech.

Media and organizational network 
In 1997, Sasek founded the Elaion Publishing House and the Community Teaching Service. Since 1999, he has expanded OCG from a family business into a barely manageable network of commercial subsidiarys, organizations, and media products that spread his political mission worldwide. By his own account, since 2012 his companies have produced some 100 in 165 film and sound studios with more than 213 female and male presenters. 000 broadcasts in 42 languages, which had been broadcast in 212 countries. In 2006, Sasek directed the film Heroes Die Differently about Arnold Winkelried, a mythical figure in Swiss history, which he initiated. He made other films, which he promoted through his Panorama Filmverleih as moral life aids for marriages and families. In 2008, he founded an Anti-Genocide Party (AGP) against an alleged imminent genocide of "freedom-loving people, Bible believers, Jews and Muslims"; his wife was vice-president.

Sasek's print and web media evaluate current issues with conspiracy theory commentary, such as on chemtrails, New World Order, high finance, terrorist attacks, climate change, euro crisis, Germanwings flight 9525. They print speeches by Muammar al-Gaddafi and Mahmoud Ahmadinejad "uncensored," warn of an allegedly imminent obligation to implant electronic identity chips for total state surveillance, discredit vaccination campaigns, claim an "Aids lie," interpret the Ukraine crisis 2014 and the refugee crisis in Europe from 2015 as means of targeted destabilization, and predict a third world war.

Klagemauer TV (kla.tv) 
Sasek's organization founded the online channel Klagemauer.tv (abbreviated as Kla.TV). Sasek's son Elias heads the station and its Internet team.

Since at least 2016, Kla.TV has published many videos on current political events. In a professionally dressed-up studio, a female announcer reads out various "news" stories that the "mainstream media" allegedly suppress. According to Meedia observers, the broadcasts are reminiscent of Kopp Verlag's earlier news programs and, like them, attempt to give conspiracy-theory reports a serious airing.

In May 2019, representatives of Kla.TV and AZK attended a conference of far-right, right-wing populist, and conspiracy ideology media, hosted by the AfD-Bundestagfraktion in the German Bundestag. AfD deputy Nicole Höchst, who had already been interviewed by Kla.TV, accepted wish lists from the representatives to present to the parliamentary group. It was desired, for example, that AfD deputies share only their own posts on Facebook and Twitter, and no longer those of the "system press." These contacts are classified as the formation of right-wing anti-democratic networks. The Federal Office for the Protection of the Constitution hardly monitors esoteric media like those from Sasek's environment so far.

The station spreads far-right, antisemitic and general conspiracy theories. An antisemitic claim about September 11, 2001 was spread, according to which the U.S. government itself perpetrated the September 11, 2001 terrorist attacks. Behind it, he said, was the Rothschild family, which sought control of national banks worldwide. A "financial oligarchy" of the U.S. was using refugee flows to Europe to cause chaos in Germany, divide the population, and drive it into a civil war. In sermons, Sasek claims Freemasons, Bilderberg or a Jewish sect are secret masterminds of such events. The goal of these secret societies, he said, was the almost complete annihilation of humanity and the world domination of the devils they served.

In October 2016, Klagemauer.tv showed the propaganda film "Hellstorm" by the American neo-Nazi Kyle Hunt. The passage according to which the National Socialists had made Germany a hopeful country again was left out, the credits with hitlergrüssenden children and dancing people in front of swastika flags were retained and deleted only after criticism from the media. Sasek explained that the purpose of the broadcast was "Never again war ... No more war propaganda by US warmongers." Like far-right historical revisionists, he spoke in a sermon of a "commanded" writing of history. The decades-long remembrance of the Holocaust and National Socialism served the devil's plans for world domination. The alleged "constant agitation ... against national consciousness (Holocaust because of national pride)" serves the goal to "dissolve every nation state as well as every religion. From it the 1ne world state with only 1ner world government, with only 1ner world religion, 1ner world currency etc. is to emerge."

On Kla.TV films, elements of QAnon ideology can also be found without direct mention of it, e.g. contributions to the Deep State, to Adrenochrome and alleged satanist child abuse.

Youth TV and "OCG Youth" 
The OCG maintains its own youth organization, the OCG Youth, with its own web presence. As an offer for children and young people Youth TV was founded. The main presenter was Sasek's daughter Anna-Sophie. The Internet station is visually and content-wise like Klagemauer.tv, only with 8- to 20-year-old speakers for the corresponding target group. They, too, are mostly from OCG families, including Sasek's children. The undercover, non-contactable operators could be traced back to the Saseks' "Panorama-Film-Café" in Walzenhausen via the page source text. The speakers claimed, for example, that schools and teachers propagate homosexuality and urge young people to become homosexuals. Ebola was comparable to ordinary influenza; the World Health Organization was using the epidemic as a means to dominate governments. Israel is the world leader in the organ trade and sees this as compensation for the Holocaust. Youth TV, like AZK, represents all varieties of the conspiracy theory scene and packages them as short news items in language suitable for children. The station presents antisemitic, homophobic hate propaganda and rejection of a free lifestyle as normal attitudes and conveys a basic anti-democratic skepticism toward society to young people seeking orientation. Thus he wants to recruit new followers for the OCG. According to a former Youth TV host, Sasek and his associates see themselves in an information war against the mass media. In order to cast doubt on their information, he said, they take their broadcast material unchecked from right-wing populist, conspiracy-theory websites. The cultural scientist Eva Kimminich analyzed the broadcasts as fake news, in which facts were placed in other, invented contexts and thus twisted.

The video clips of both broadcasters coincide in content and often literally, without referring to each other. The address in their imprint, which can be traced back to the Saseks, was changed after media reports about it. The broadcasters do not provide any information about filming locations, producers and editorial offices of their videos. Alleged "studios" in Augsburg, Roth, Nuremberg, Karlsruhe and Dresden have no addresses. Adults, young people and children from OCG house groups produce sound recordings, television graphics, books and DVDs, for example the association "Leben in Christus" in Mertingen. Sasek denies responsibility for their products, but emphasizes that the producers do everything voluntarily and without coercion. The children involved would hardly get the contents of the conspiracy program. In 2016, the Bayerische Landeszentrale für neue Medien stated that it could not take legal action against programs broadcast from Swiss servers.

Against the allegedly censored mainstream press, Sasek and his followers publish the leaflet Stimme und Gegenstimme (S&G), the Antizensurzeitung (AZZ), and newsletters such as Der Ölbaum and Panorama. On numerous websites of their own, such as www.ivo-sasek.ch, www.klagemauer.tv, and www.anti-zensur.info, Sasek and his followers counter criticism with rebuttals to allegedly set the record straight about "the most serious lies about Ivo Sasek, his family, and his ministry." Starting in 2014, the pamphlet "Voice and Countervoice" was regularly offered at the Monday Vigils for Peace events and sold as "serious reporting that helps establish the truth."

Hacker action 
Starting in 2020, Sasek's media spread COVID-19 misinformation and stoked fears about vaccination against the virus. In response, the hacker collective Anonymous announced in July 2020 that it would expose Sasek's OCG activities as part of its Operation Tinfoil. In two weeks, the activists hacked several OCG websites and servers, including its youth channel Kla.TV. The online activists hacked Sasek's website lügen-barometer.info and redirected visitors to an article critical of OCG. They also gained access to Kla.TV's database and administrators' area, allowing them to sabotage the broadcast schedule. Among other things, the name of the controversial Swiss historian Daniele Ganser was frequently in the database.

They thus had 30,000 emails and more than 20 gigabytes of internal documents, which they published gradually. Beginning on July 24, 2020, Anonymous posted OCG documents online showing Sasek's media network, production locations, takeover of KlaTV content by cable stations, child abuse, and OCG contacts with Scientology. Sasek attributed the hacking attack to Antifa in two videos, calling the hackers "virtual hitmen" in the service of hostile mass media. Anonymous countered Sasek's claim with its own independent video describing the cult's intentions and structures, saying Sasek was relentlessly exploiting the current COVID-19 pandemic and insecurity of many people with his anti-Semitic-esoteric conspiracy ideologies, including financially. Anonymous announced further actions against the OCG and its propaganda broadcasters.

Classification 
The state churches as well as free churches classify Sasek's teachings as heresy. For representatives of the mainline churches, his messages show typical characteristics of a cult. The sect commissioners of the Evangelical Church in Germany (EKD) describe the OCG as a Christian fundamentalist group whose strict understanding of faith combines with current conspiracy theories. Scientific studies refuted Sasek's educational advice: Corporal punishment is pedagogically pointless, harms child development when used systematically, and creates a spiral of violence. The Swiss Evangelical Alliance (SEA) and the Association of Evangelical Free Churches and Congregations in Switzerland distanced themselves from any form of physical violence in education. In the Christian fundamentalist scene, however, Sasek's theses are discussed; his patriarchal family model and his educational ideas find imitators. Other Christian splinter groups more often form alliances of convenience with the OCG, although they usually reject Sasek's claim to be an apostle and prophet.

The cult researcher Georg Otto Schmid (Protestant Information Center: Churches - Sects - Religions) opined in 2014 that the OCG had shrunk. Sasek had changed from a conservative fundamentalist to an esotericist and world conspirator. He only finds followers whose world conspiracy view coincides with biblical faithfulness, not among larger segments of the population. The association Freiwillige Selbstkontrolle Multimedia-Diensteanbieter (FSM) classified Youth TV as a danger to children and young people, however, because the channel presented conspiracy theories like youth news, created a reference to the children's lifeworld through direct address, and caused "socio-ethical disorientation" through an appeal character.
In July 2015, the city council of Frauenfeld banned Pegida rallies at which Sasek was scheduled to speak for security reasons. Its influence extends beyond the OCG to esotericists, Holocaust deniers, Scientologists and right-wing conspiracy theorists. Via the Internet, groups like the Saseks are attracting greater attention, according to the association Sekten-Info NRW. For children, the propagation of fear, social isolation and ineffective esoteric healing methods are particularly dangerous. Against it schools would have to promote the medium authority of young people and adults.

For publicist Matthias Pöhlmann, "the Swiss preacher of doom is manifestly not only part of, but a crucial driver for a broad-based anti-democratic Crossfront strategy."

Publications (selection) 
 Shaking: causes - effects - ways out. 4th supplemented edition, Elaion (self-published), Walzenhausen 2007.
 Simon, David and Loisa Sasek: Mama, please chastise me! 2nd revised and supplemented edition, Elaion (self-published), Walzenhausen 2002.

Literature 
 Matthias Pöhlmann: Organic Christ Generation / Anti-Censorship Coalition / Ivo Sasek. In: Matthias Pöhlmann, Christine Jahn (eds. on behalf of the VELKD): Handbuch Weltanschauungen, Religiöse Gemeinschaften, Freikirchen. (with CD-ROM) Gütersloher Verlagshaus / Random House, Gütersloh 2015, ISBN 978-3-579-08224-0, pp. 378–390.
 Claudia Knepper: Harmony, Obedience, and Punishment. Ivo Sasek's teaching on child rearing. In: Materialdienst der Evangelischen Zentralstelle für Weltanschauungsfragen. 4 / 2011, pp. 132–139. (text-excerpt online)
 Harald Lamprecht: Organic Christ Generation. Ivo Sasek and his movement. Materialdienst der Evangelischen Zentralstelle für Weltanschauungsfragen. 4 / 2003, PP. 132-143

TV reports 
 Radical Christians - My exit from the OCG (Part 1). In: Reporter (SRF), 13 April 2022 (YouTube; Swiss German, with German subtitles).
 Radical Christians - My exit from the OCG (Part 2). In: Reporter (SRF), April 20, 2022 (YouTube; Swiss German, with German subtitles).
 https://www.youtube.com/watch?v=arTnttV3S7w Christian sect OCG: Son of sect leader unpacks. From CTRL_F

External links 
 
 Organic Christ Generation (OCG): Brief Information. (PDF) Arbeitsstelle für Weltanschauungsfragen, Evangelische Landeskirche in Württemberg, November 2019.
 Educational understandings in evangelical educational guides and courses. (PDF; 854 kB) infoSekta (specialist office for sectarian issues), Zurich.
 OCG Organic Christ Generation / Ivo Sasek of the Protestant Information Center Churches - Sects - Religions
 web presence of Ivo Sasek
 Introduction: Operation Tinfoil - Wailing Wall TV (kla.tv), Ivo Sasek and the OCG (Organic Christ Generation). Anonymous / rentry.co, July 19, 2020.
 Eveline Falk: Sons of cult leader Ivo Sasek confirm child abuse. In: SRF.ch, April 20, 2022.

Individual references 

Esotericism
Christianity and politics
1956 births
Christian conspiracy theorists
Swiss nationalists
Swiss conspiracy theorists
Swiss Holocaust deniers
German nationalists
German conspiracy theorists
German Holocaust deniers
Anti-same-sex-marriage activists
Anti-vaccination activists
Living people